Brigadier Alfred Maurice Toye  (15 April 1897, Aldershot – 6 September 1955, Tiverton, Devon) was an English recipient of the Victoria Cross, the highest and most prestigious award for gallantry in the face of the enemy that can be awarded to British and Commonwealth forces.

Military career
Toye was born in Aldershot in 1897, the son of James Robert Toye (1854–1943), an Army Pensioner and Clerk, and Elizabeth Charlotte (née Dodds, 1862-1947). He was educated at the Garrison School in Aldershot before enlisting into the Royal Engineers as a bugler in 1912 before being commissioned into the Middlesex Regiment during World War I. Before joining the Army, Toye was an active Boy Scout, attaining the rank of patrol leader at the 2nd Aldershot Scout Troop. He was the first member of his troop to become a King’s Scout. 

He was 20 years old, and an acting British Army Captain in the 2nd Battalion, The Middlesex Regiment (Duke of Cambridge's Own), during the First World War when the following deed took place for which he was awarded the VC.

On 25 March 1918 at Eterpigny Ridge, France, Captain Toye displayed conspicuous bravery and fine leadership. He three times re-established a post which had been captured by the enemy and, when his three other posts were cut off, he fought his way through the enemy with one officer and six men. He counter-attacked with 70 men and took up a line which he maintained until reinforcements arrived. In two subsequent operations he covered the retirement of his battalion and later re-established a line that had been abandoned before his arrival. He was twice wounded but remained on duty.

After the war

A week after his investiture with the VC at Aldershot he married Flora Robertson (1896-1979) at the Church of St Michael in his native Aldershot. They had two daughters, Joan Flora Toye (1920-2017) and Enid Audrey Toye (1925-2000). From 1925 to 1932 he was chief instructor at the Royal Egyptian Military College and Commandant of War Office Schools of Chemical Warfare 1940- 1942. Toye then joined the teaching staff at the Staff College, Camberley. From 1934 to 1944 he was on active service with the 6th Airborne Division and with General Headquarters, Middle East from 1945 to 1948. He later achieved the rank of Brigadier serving with the 6th Airborne Division in World War II. He retired to Tiverton in Devon where he died in 1955 at the Madame Curie Memorial Foundation at Tidcombe Hall in Tiverton and is buried in Tiverton Cemetery.

On 25 March 2018, on the 100th anniversary of the action in which he won his Victoria Cross during World War I, a memorial to Toye was unveiled in the Municipal Gardens in his native Aldershot.

Victoria Cross
His Victoria Cross is displayed at the National Army Museum, Chelsea, England.

References

Monuments to Courage (David Harvey, 1999)
The Register of the Victoria Cross (This England, 1997)
The Sapper VCs (Gerald Napier, 1998)
VCs of the First World War - Spring Offensive 1918 (Gerald Gliddon, 1997)

External links
Royal Engineers Museum Sappers VCs
Location of grave and VC medal (Devonshire)

1897 births
1955 deaths
Burials in Devon
Military personnel from Aldershot
Royal Engineers soldiers
Middlesex Regiment officers
British World War I recipients of the Victoria Cross
British Army personnel of World War I
Recipients of the Military Cross
Oxfordshire and Buckinghamshire Light Infantry officers
British Army brigadiers of World War II
British Army recipients of the Victoria Cross
Academics of the Staff College, Camberley